Sky 99.5fm (previously Radio Trinidad 730 AM) is a radio station in Trinidad and Tobago owned by the TBC Radio Network.

References

Radio stations in Trinidad and Tobago